Nand Lal Singh College is a degree college in Daudpur, Bihar. It is a constituent unit of Jai Prakash University. College offers Three years Degree Course (TDC) in Arts and Science.

History 
College was established in the year 1966.

Departments 

 Arts
 Hindi
  English
 Sanskrit
 Philosophy
 Economics
 Political Science
 History
 Geography
 Psychology
 Science
 Mathematics
 Physics
 Chemistry
 Zoology
 Botany
 Agriculture

References

External links 

 Official website
 Jai Prakash University website

Colleges in India
Constituent colleges of Jai Prakash University
Educational institutions established in 1966
1966 establishments in Bihar